Pedrewadi is a small village in Ajra Taluka, Kolhapur District, Maharashtra, India. Sunderwadi is an alias of Pedrewadi.

Villages in Kolhapur district